Melodic hardcore is a broadly defined subgenre of hardcore punk with a strong emphasis on melody in its guitar work. It generally incorporates fast rhythms, melodic and often distorted guitar riffs, and vocal styles tending towards shouting and screaming. Nevertheless, the genre has been very diverse, with different bands showcasing very different styles. Many pioneering melodic hardcore bands (such as Bad Religion and Descendents), have proven influential across the spectrum of punk rock, as well as rock music more generally. The term melodic punk is often used to describe both melodic hardcore and skate punk bands.

Characteristics
Melodic hardcore is broadly defined, however generally incorporates fast rhythms, melodic and often distorted guitar riffs, and vocal styles tending towards shouting and screaming. Many notable bands, such as Dag Nasty and Lifetime use minor interval chords on guitar, such as minor ninth and seventh chords, as well as fifth or ninth harmonies on vocals. Many groups also drop tune their instruments. Tempos commonly range from 180 to 210 beats per minute, with very few bands ranging outside of a 4/4 time signature.

Many modern melodic hardcore bands are incorporating elements of melodic hardcore and emo, relying more heavily upon melody than their hardcore punk predecessors. There are also bands that take influence from post-hardcore and melodic metalcore.

As modern melodic hardcore diverges into one more metalcore leaning track as well as one more emotive track, terms such as "melodic emotive hardcore" and "melodic metallic hardcore"  have been suggested to distinguish modern melodic hardcore bands with different sounds that still fall into the same genre. Bands such as the Ghost Inside, Blood Youth, Climates, and Hundredth, have been described as both metalcore and melodic hardcore while While She Sleeps is also considered as merging melodic hardcore elements with metalcore. Casey, La Dispute and Being as an Ocean, who are active in the modern melodic hardcore scene, incorporate elements of post-rock/post-black metal and/or spoken word into their music.

History

Original development (1980s–1990s) 
The earliest melodic hardcore emerged from the Californian hardcore punk scene by the early 1980s. This includes Descendents, who formed in 1978. Their earliest work was simple, pop-influenced punk rock, but they went on to mix this melodic approach with hardcore, inspiring both melodic hardcore and pop punk groups. Bad Religion, who formed in Los Angeles in 1979, played in a somewhat similar vein, but their approach was more "angry" and politically charged. They recorded their debut album, How Could Hell Be Any Worse?, in 1981.

The Faith's 1983 EP Subject to Change is thought of as one of the first melodic hardcore records, as significant as the music of Bad Religion or the Descendents. On the release, the band added and moved away from the more straightforward hardcore punk of their earlier work towards a more complex, textured, and melodic sound, accompanied by introspective lyrics; the release is notable for its influence on post-hardcore.

Dag Nasty are a key melodic hardcore band that formed during the mid-1980s as part of the Washington, D.C. hardcore scene, with Brian Baker (ex-Minor Threat) on guitar. In 1988, the band All formed, featuring three members of The Descendents. The band made music in a broadly similar vein to the Descendents, and were initially fronted by Dave Smalley of Dag Nasty. Gorilla Biscuits came out of the late 1980s New York hardcore scene, and played a melodic form of the hardcore subgenre known as youth crew. Youth crew itself takes a lot of influence from 7 Seconds, who ventured into melodic hardcore on albums such as The Crew. Turning Point, a New Jersey hardcore band, also emerged from the youth crew movement, but their later material moved towards melodic hardcore, with more complex music and introspective lyrics.

In 1994, H2O formed, mixing melodic elements of Washington D.C. with New York & California hardcore punk.  Lifetime was a notable emo group whose sound drew heavily on pop punk and melodic hardcore. Along with other melodic hardcore groups, they had much influence on subsequent pop punk, including bands such as Fall Out Boy and Saves the Day. When Lifetime broke up, some of their members formed Kid Dynamite. During the 1990s, the "Epi-Fat" sound (a variant of skate punk named after the labels that housed its key bands, Epitaph Records and Fat Wreck Chords) was popular, and key bands such as NOFX, Pennywise  and Strung Out bordered on melodic hardcore influenced by the likes of Descendents and Bad Religion.

Modern melodic hardcore (2000s–present) 

Rise Against, formed in 1999, achieved widespread commercial success with the release of their major label debut Siren Song of the Counter Culture in 2004, along with bands such as Strike Anywhere, Consumed, Ignite, Belvedere and A Wilhelm Scream, who continued the traditional style of melodic hardcore. Whereas, in the early to mid-2000s, the genre was transformed through the work of newly formed bands including Killing the Dream, Modern Life Is War, The Hope Conspiracy, Sinking Ships, Have Heart, Verse, The Carrier, Ruiner, This Is Hell, as well as the Canadian band Comeback Kid, many of which are housed by key hardcore labels Bridge 9 Records and Deathwish Inc. Thereafter by about 2009, "the likes of Defeater, Touché Amoré, the Ghost Inside, Counterparts, Being as an Ocean, Stick to Your Guns, Vanna, and many more became the new faces of melodic, emotional hardcore", creating an overlap with post-hardcore and metalcore in current melodic hardcore.

Many bands have crossed over into or out of the genre. Beartooth's sophomore album Aggressive marked a departure from their conventional hardcore punk sound into a style more reminiscent of melodic hardcore. Hundredth began as a band fusing metalcore and melodic hardcore, however eventually evolved into playing shoegaze on their fourth album Rare. Traditional melodic hardcore band Strung Out began playing a heavily metal-influenced style on their eighth album Transmission.Alpha.Delta. After playing in the genre on their albums Black Sails in the Sunset and The Art of Drowning, California's AFI began to play a more commercially accessible sound on 2003's Sing the Sorrow. The White Noise began as an electronicore band on their first two records Set the Sun and Desolate, before beginning to play melodic metallic hardcore.

References

Further reading 
Sharpe-Young, Garry, New wave of American heavy metal, New Plymouth, New Zealand: Zonda Books, 2005. 
Larkin, Colin, The Guinness encyclopedia of popular music; Enfield, Middlesex, England: Guinness Pub.; New York: Stockton Press, 1995. 
Budofsky, Adam; Heusel, Michele; Dawson, Michael Ray and Parillo, Michael, The drummer: 100 years of rhythmic power and invention; Cedar Grove, NJ: Modern Drummer Publications; Milwaukee: Exclusively distributed by Hal Leonard Corp., 2006. 

Hardcore punk genres
Punk rock genres